The Pützer Elster was a German single-engined light aircraft, manufactured by Alfons Pützer KG (later Sportavia) in Bonn. It served with the Luftwaffe and Marineflieger and was used solely for recreational sport flying. Some continue to fly in 2020 in private ownership.

Development history
The Pützer Elster "Magpie" was developed from the Motorraab motor glider which had itself been developed from the Doppelraab  glider. The Elster was the first aircraft produced in Germany after World War II in any significant numbers. The design shared the wing of the Doppelraab, braced by metal struts, but was given a new monocoque fuselage constructed of plywood with seats for two occupants arranged side by side. The tricycle landing gear unusually featured a steerable nosewheel controlled by a hand grip.
Production ceased in 1967, by which time 45 examples had been built.

Variants

Elster
Prototype aircraft fitted with a 52 hp Porsche 678/3 engine, first flight 10 January 1959.

Elster B

Main production version fitted with a 95 hp Continental C-90 engine. 25 aircraft were operated by the Luftwaffe and Marineflieger sport flying groups. These aircraft were initially operated with civilian registrations but were allocated military serials in 1971. In 1978 the maintenance contract with Pützer expired and the aircraft were placed on the civil market.

Elster C
The Elster C was fitted with the more powerful 150 hp Lycoming O-320 engine and other modifications for use as a glider tug.

Operators

Military operators

Luftwaffe
Marineflieger

Specifications (Pützer Elster B)

See also

References

Further reading

External links

Photo of Elster B in Luftwaffe markings

Elster
1950s German civil utility aircraft
1950s German military utility aircraft
Single-engined tractor aircraft
High-wing aircraft
Glider tugs
Aircraft first flown in 1959